
Big Fish is a 2003 American film.

Big Fish may also refer to:

 Big Fish: A Novel of Mythic Proportions, the novel by Daniel Wallace on which the film is based
 Big Fish (musical), the Broadway musical based on Wallace's novel and John August's screenplay
 Big Fish (soundtrack), the soundtrack album from the film

Arts, entertainment, and media

Music 
 Big Fish (band), a Swedish rock band
 Reel Big Fish, an American punk ska band
 Big Fish Theory, 2017 album by Vince Staples
 "Big Fish" (song), a single from the album
 "Big Fish", 1998 song by Far From Home from the album I Want to Be Like You
 "Big Fish", 2020 song by Zhou Shen from his TME Live album Good Night, See You Tomorrow (周深"晚安 明天见"TME live 超现场)

Television
 Big Fish (TV series), an Australian fishing show
 "Big Fish", an episode of the TV series Joe 90

Other arts, entertainment, and media
 The Big Fish, a sculpture by John Kindness
 Big Fish Games, an online game portal

Other uses
 Big Fish Golf Club, a golf course in Wisconsin
 BK Big Fish, a Burger King sandwich
 Big Fish (yacht), a luxury yacht launched in 2010
 The Big Fish (roadside attraction), a former drive-in restaurant in Minnesota
 The Big Fish, a term in darts to indicate a 170 checkout finish

See also
 Big-fish–little-pond effect, a theory in psychology
 List of largest fish